John Ault  is a former Liberal Democrat politician in England. He is now an academic, election observer, and writer.

Personal life 

Ault was raised in Grappenhall, Cheshire attending The Grange School, Hartford. He studied for an Open degree at the Open University and subsequently received his PhD from the University of Exeter in 2014.

Political career 

Ault entered local politics in 1992 being elected to the Appleton Parish Council at the age of 21. He contested the Wyre parliamentary constituency in the same year and South Lancashire European Parliamentary constituency in 1994 – where the future leader of the Liberal Democrats, Tim Farron, acted as Ault's election agent.
Having moved to Cornwall to become election agent to future Liberal Democrat MP, Colin Breed, he contested Calstock in the 1997 Cornwall County Council Elections. Working for the Liberal Democrats he was agent for the Eddisbury, Wigan, Preston and Ogmore by-elections between 1999 and 2002 and contested the Methyr Tydil and Rhymney Welsh Assembly Seat in 2003.
Having returned to Cornwall in 2003 he won the Rame division of Cornwall County Council, defeating the present Member of Parliament for South East Cornwall, Sheryll Murray in 2005.

Following the UK referendum on the Alternative Vote in 2011 Ault was Chair of the Electoral Reform Society from 2011 to 2012.

In 2009, Ault stood in the Cornwall Council election for the Falmouth Trescobeas division, coming in third place. In the 2013 elections, he contested the Mabe, Perranarworthal and St Gluvias division, again coming third. Ault stood again for the Mabe, Perranarworthal and St Gluvias seat in a by-election in 2014. He failed to win the seat by just 1 vote.

Ault also appeared on BBC's Top Gear where he won ‘The Fastest Political Party’ in Season 2 of the show in 2003.

Election observation 

Ault is also involved in international and UK election observation in his role as Director of Democracy Volunteers. He has observed international elections in the United States, Kazakhstan and Canada as well as UK elections and referendums.

Academic career 

In 2008, Ault became a member of staff at the University of Exeter (Penryn) where he now lectures politics as an Associate Research Fellow and is director of the Cornish Audio-Visual Archive (CAVA).

Publications

Books 

Liberal Democrats in Cornwall – Culture, Character or Campaigns?, Amazon 2015 

By-elections: Essays of the Nations (Nationalist Expression), Amazon 2015 

Thirty Days in February, Amazon 2016

Academic articles 

The Inter-War Cornish By-Elections: Microcosm of 'Rebellion'? in Cornish Studies, Volume 20, Number 1, 1 May 2012, pp. 241–259(19)(ed. Philip Payton) 

The other Rathbone: Beatrice, the trans-Atlantic envoy, Issue 71 Women's History Magazine, Spring 2013

References 

Living people
Alumni of the University of Exeter
Academics of the University of Exeter
English male writers
Fellows of the Royal Geographical Society
Year of birth missing (living people)
Liberal Democrats (UK) councillors
Members of Cornwall County Council
People educated at The Grange School, Northwich